Wolfgang Fasching (born August 11, 1967) is a three-time winner of the Race Across America (RAAM).  Following his cycling career, Fasching became a mountaineer, author, and motivational speaker.  

2011 RAAM winner and fellow Austrian Christoph Strasser has stated that his decision to begin ultra cycling was inspired by Fasching, and Fasching has subsequently mentored Strasser.

Notes

Austrian male cyclists
1967 births
Living people
Ultra-distance cyclists